Ulises Torres Méndez (born 17 February 1998) is a Mexican professional footballer who plays as a midfielder for Sonora. He was included in The Guardian's "Next Generation 2015".

International career
Torres was called up for the 2017 FIFA U-20 World Cup.

Career statistics

Club

Honours
Mexico U17
CONCACAF U-17 Championship: 2015

References

1998 births
Living people
Mexican footballers
Mexican expatriate footballers
Mexico youth international footballers
Association football defenders
Club América footballers
Atlas F.C. footballers
Salamanca CF UDS players
Cimarrones de Sonora players
Liga Premier de México players
Segunda División B players
Mexican expatriate sportspeople in Spain
Expatriate footballers in Spain
Footballers from Mexico City